Hwang Song-Su (黄誠秀, 10 July 1987) is a Zainichi Korean football player, who has represented North Korea in international competition. He currently features for Criacao Shinjuku.

Club statistics
Updated to 23 February 2019.

References

External links
Profile at Oita Trinita

1987 births
Living people
Association football people from Tokyo
North Korean footballers
J1 League players
J2 League players
J3 League players
Júbilo Iwata players
Thespakusatsu Gunma players
Oita Trinita players
Association football midfielders